Fred Cook (born Aberdare,  – 1966) was a Welsh international footballer who played in the Football League as an outside-left for Aberdare Athletic, Newport County and Portsmouth, for whom he appeared in the 1929 FA Cup Final. He was part of the Wales national football team between 1925 and 1931, playing eight matches. He played his first match on 14 February 1925 against Scotland and his last match on 18 November 1931 against England.

See also
 List of Wales international footballers (alphabetical)

References

1902 births
Welsh footballers
Wales international footballers
Place of birth missing
Date of death missing
1966 deaths
Association football outside forwards
FA Cup Final players
Aberdare Athletic F.C. players
Waterford F.C. players